Kabeela is a 1976 Indian Hindi-language drama film produced and directed by Bholu Khosla and starring Feroz Khan, Rekha, Bindu, Premnath in pivotal roles. The music is by Kalyanji-Anandji.

Plot
Shobha (Rekha) lives a poor lifestyle along with her widower dad, Murari, in a village. One day a gypsy, Mangal (Feroz Khan), comes to her rescue when she gets attacked by a raging bull. They continue to meet after the incident and fall in love with each other. Shortly thereafter, she is abducted and taken to a man named Dildaar. Mangal once again saves her and takes her to her house only to find that her father has died. Lalaji, an evil man, spreads rumours about Shobha when she refuses to marry him and the villagers subsequently disown her. Will a lonely and abandoned Shobha be able to survive?

Cast
Feroz Khan as Mangal
Rekha as Shobha
Bindu as Bijli
Premnath as Sardar Babbar
Kamini Kaushal as Champakali
 Imtiaz Khan as Durjan
 Sharat Saxena as Shaitan Singh
 Harbans Darshan M Arora as Police Officer
 Sudhir as Police inspector Ajay
 Manju Asrani as Sawli
 Shyam Kumar as Dildaar
 Hiralal as Santol
 Dhumal as Lalaji
 Bhagwan Dada as Durjan's victim
 Trilok Kapoor as Santan
 Habib as Santo, the man who brings bombs
 Surendranath as Murari, Shobha's father
 V Gopal as Lala the shopkeeper

Songs

Trivia 
In the movie, gypsy tribe is shown doing armed robberies, human trafficking. Actually they are not known to do so.

External links 
 

1976 films
1970s Hindi-language films
Films scored by Kalyanji Anandji